This is a list of eggplant cultivars:

 Lao eggplant
 Easter white eggplant
 Indian eggplant
 Santana eggplant
 White eggplant - :commons:Category:White eggplant
 Tango eggplant

 Eggplant-related fruits

Notes 

 List
Eggplant